Porters Lake South Water Aerodrome  is located  south southwest of Porters Lake, Nova Scotia, Canada and is open from May to November.

See also
 Porters Lake Airport
 Porters Lake Water Aerodrome

References

Registered aerodromes in Nova Scotia
Transport in Halifax, Nova Scotia
Seaplane bases in Nova Scotia